Legal vacuum may refer to:

 A legal context which is non liquet ("it is not clear"), there is no applicable law, or in which some injustice is uncorrected
 A failed state